The Church of St Mary the Virgin, Nash is the parish church of the village of Nash, situated about  south of the city of Newport, Wales. Described as "the cathedral of the moors" by Monmouthshire historian Fred Hando, the large church is medieval in origin, with additions and restorations dating from the 18th and 19th centuries. Newman describes the 15th-century steeple as "unique in South East Wales". Since 3 January 1963 it has been designated a Grade I listed building primarily due to its "medieval tower with fine spire."

Description
The church consists of three parts. It has a three-story 15th-century steeple with an octagonal spire, but provides no access to the body of the church. The nave is 18th-century and the chancel 19th-century. The interior has "a complete Georgian ensemble of gallery, box pews and three-decker pulpit." Since 3 January 1963 it has been designated a Grade I listed building. primarily due to its "medieval tower with fine spire."

History
The church belonged to Goldcliff Priory in 1349 when Robert Arney was instituted to the benefice. The church was largely rebuilt during the 16th century.

The only remains of the Norman church is the North Wall of the chancel and the squint or hagioscope. An unusual feature, the squint was used to enable those with leprosy, smallpox or other such diseases, to see or participate in the service without endangering the rest of the congregation with infection. The tower is unusually located on the north side of the chancel. The church is thought to originally have been much larger, incorporating a North aisle.

In the early years of the 20th century the floor of the bellringer's room was used as a temporary mortuary for the bodies of five sailors who had been drowned at sea, in a violent storm, near the East Usk Lighthouse. Four of the sailors had been found lashed to the mast. During World War II the church saw congregations of 400. In the fields to the south of the neighbouring Church Farm are ancient tumuli, the vestiges of some ancient, possibly mediæval, dwelling or chapel.

The church interior was restored in 2004–2005. Sunday services are held weekly at 9.30am and the church is also open daily from 10am to 4pm during July and August.

Described as "the cathedral of the moors" by Monmouthshire historian Fred Hando. Newman describes the 15th-century steeple as "unique in South East Wales".

Great flood of 1607

On 30 January 1607 the Bristol Channel floods drowned many people and destroyed a large amount of farmland and livestock; recent research has suggested that the cause is likely to have been a storm surge. There is a memorial plaque in St Mary's church in neighbouring Goldcliff. A contemporary depiction of the flood shows a church thought to be St Mary's, Nash.

Notes

References
 Newman, John (2002), The Buildings of Wales: Gwent/Monmouthshire, New Haven; London: Yale University Press. .
Hando, F.J. (1958), Out and About in Monmouthshire, Newport: R. H. Johns.

Nash, St Mary
Nash, St Mary